In acoustics, the prefix of a sound is an initial phase, the onset of a sound quite dissimilar to the ensuing lasting vibration.

The term was coined by J. F. Schouten (1968, 42), who called it one of at least five major acoustic parameters that determine the elusive attributes of timbre.

See also

 Onset (audio)
 Timbre#Attributes
 Synthesizer#ADSR envelope
 Transient (acoustics)

References
 Schouten, J. F. (1968). "The Perception of Timbre". In Reports of the 6th International Congress on Acoustics, Tokyo, GP-6-2, 6 vols., edited by Y. Kohasi, 6:35–44, 90. Tokyo: Maruzen; Amsterdam: Elsevier.

Acoustics